SAM 123 is a fictitious license plate number in the United States and Canada, often reserved for use as an example license plate, similar to the way the 555 telephone number is a fictitious telephone number prefix, to be used for creating example telephone numbers.  Some states have also reserved the combination "SAMPLE". However, not all states and provinces use SAM 123, with it appearing on regularly issued license plates. These states and provinces tend to use other numbers such as ABC 123.

Some of the uses include photographs of license plates for advertising purposes, for use as a fictitious license plate on automobiles in films, and for any other purpose where use of a real license plate number is undesirable.

See also
 2GAT123

Vehicle registration plates
Placeholder names